Daniel Sekhoto (1 November 1970 – 2 May 2008) was a football player from South Africa.

References

1970 births
2008 deaths
South African soccer players

Association footballers not categorized by position